Anthony Robert Guy (born July 4, 1959) is an American former professional basketball player. He was a McDonald's All-American while playing at Loyola High School in Towson, Maryland. Guy played collegiately for the Kansas Jayhawks, where he served as team captain during his final two seasons. He was selected by the Boston Celtics as the 46th overall pick in the 1982 NBA draft but was told by Celtics general manager Red Auerbach that he would not make the team and should instead hone his skills in the Continental Basketball Association (CBA) that season. Guy split the 1982–83 season in the CBA with the Wyoming Wildcatters and the Maine Lumberjacks before receiving an unsuccessful tryout with the New York Knicks. He played in Switzerland for one season and then returned to tryout for the Cleveland Cavaliers. A hamstring injury suffered two weeks before the start of the 1984–85 NBA season derailed his chances of making the team and he retired from playing basketball.

Guy enrolled in the University of Missouri–Kansas City graduate business school. After graduating, he received a position with State Farm in the Kansas City Area, where he has worked for 30 years.

Career statistics

College

|-
| style="text-align:left;"| 1978–79
| style="text-align:left;"| Kansas
| 29 || 29 || 29.4 || .461 || – || .711 || 3.6 || 2.2 || 1.3 || .1 || 9.2
|-
| style="text-align:left;"| 1979–80
| style="text-align:left;"| Kansas
| 29 || 17 || 30.6 || .481 || – || .785 || 3.6 || 2.5 || 1.1 || .1 || 10.9
|-
| style="text-align:left;"| 1980–81
| style="text-align:left;"| Kansas
| 32 || 32 || 36.2 || .537 || – || .776 || 3.5 || 2.8 || 1.9 || .1 || 15.8
|-
| style="text-align:left;"| 1981–82
| style="text-align:left;"| Kansas
| 27 || 27 || 37.5 || .433 || – || .681 || 3.5 || 3.8 || 1.1 || .1 || 14.9
|- class="sortbottom"
| style="text-align:center;" colspan="2"| Career
| 117 || 105 || 33.4 || .480 || – || .740 || 3.5 || 2.8 || 1.4 || .1 || 12.7

References

1959 births
Living people
African-American basketball players
American expatriate basketball people in Switzerland
American men's basketball players
Basketball players from Maryland
Boston Celtics draft picks
Kansas Jayhawks men's basketball players
Maine Lumberjacks players
McDonald's High School All-Americans
People from Towson, Maryland
Shooting guards
Wyoming Wildcatters players
21st-century African-American people
20th-century African-American sportspeople